Western Expressway may refer to:

Florida State Road 429, also known as the Western Expressway, Orlando, United States
Massachusetts Turnpike, originally proposed as the Western Expressway, Boston, United States

See also
 Western Freeway (disambiguation)